Jens Olsen's World Clock or Verdensur is an advanced astronomical clock which is displayed in Copenhagen City Hall.

The clock was designed and calculated by Jens Olsen (1872–1945), who was a skilled locksmith, and later learned the trade of clockmaking. He also took part in the beginning of the clock's construction, and died in 1945, 10 years before the clock was completed.

The clock consists of 12 movements which together have 15,448 parts. The clock is mechanical and must be wound once a week. Displays include lunar and solar eclipses, positions of the stellar bodies, and a perpetual calendar, in addition to the time. The fastest gear completes a revolution every ten seconds and the slowest every 25,753 years.

The calculations for the clock were made up until 1928, after which they were supervised by the astronomer Elis Strömgren. The drawings for the clock were made between 1934 and 1936, and the actual production of the clock took place from 1943 until 1955. The clock was started on 15 December 1955 by King Frederick IX and Jens Olsen's youngest grandchild Birgit.

See also
 Clock of the Long Now
 Rasmus Sørnes

Further reading
 Otto Mortensen Jens Olsen's Clock: A Technical Description Technological Institute, Copenhagen, 1957.

References

External links 
 The Story of the Astronomical Clock
 Description of Jens Olsen's World Clock Archive.org (Danish)

Astronomical clocks
Time in astronomy
Clocks in Denmark
Tourist attractions in Copenhagen
Buildings and structures completed in 1955
Individual clocks
1955 establishments in Denmark